Adrian Moțoc (born 11 July 1996 in Saumur) is a Romanian professional rugby union player. He currently plays as a lock for professional Top 14 club, Agen.

Club career
Adrian Moțoc started playing rugby with Romanian club Steaua București and from 2015 he was selected to join Top 14 club, Racing 92. After three years with Racing, Adrian signed in April 2018 a two-year contract with Top 14 side Agen.

International career
In November 2017, he was called for Romania's national team, the Oaks, making his international debut during Week 6 of the 2017 end-of-year rugby union internationals in a match against ʻIkale Tahi.

References

External links

1996 births
Living people
French people of Romanian descent
Romanian rugby union players
Romania international rugby union players
CSA Steaua București (rugby union) players
Racing 92 players
SU Agen Lot-et-Garonne players
Rugby union locks
People from Saumur